The Norwegian National Rail Administration was a government agency responsible for owning, maintaining, operating and developing the Norwegian railway network, including the track, stations, classification yards, traffic management and timetables. Safety oversight was the duty of the Norwegian Railway Inspectorate, while numerous operating companies run trains on the lines; the largest being the state owned passenger company Vy (formerly NSB) and the freight company CargoNet.

The administration operated all railways in Norway, except public station areas and freight terminals built before 1997 and private sidings. The Norwegian Railway Museum was a subsidiary of the rail administration.

On 1 December 1996, NSB was split up; formally NSB and the inspectorate were demerged from the National Rail Administration, and NSB made a limited company. All three became subordinate to the Norwegian Ministry of Transport and Communications. The administration got its own chief executive, Steinar Killi, from 1 July 1999.

On 31 December 2016, as a result of the rail reform of the Conservative lead government coalition, the administration was dissolved and all tasks were transferred to Bane NOR or the Norwegian Railway Directorate. Bane NOR  took over ownership of the infrastructure from 1 January 2017.

History
State ownership of railways was initially through partial ownership of the many lines built during the 1860s and 1870s; by 1883, the authorities decided to create the Norwegian State Railways (NSB) that would own and operate most lines. By the 1960s, passenger transport on private railways was abolished, and only a few private lines remained; the last, the Kirkenes–Bjørnevatn Line, was closed in 1997. Since then the agency has operated all railway lines in the country, except tramways and the Oslo T-bane, that are operated by their respective counties.

The National Rail Administration was created on 1 December 1996 when Norges Statsbaner was split into two agencies, the Norwegian National Rail Administration and the Norwegian Railway Inspectorate, and one limited company, NSB BA.  Until 1 July 1999, NSB and the administration continued to have the same board and the same director, Osmund Ueland.

In 1985, NSB and Televerket agreed to build a national network of optical fiber that would span the entire railway network. This remained part of Jernbaneverket until 2001, when it was transferred to the subsidiary BaneTele. The same year it bought the bankrupt telecom company Enitel, and the whole subsidiary transferred to the Norwegian Ministry of Trade and Industry in 2002.

In 2005, the maintenance division was demerged, and established as the limited company Baneservice, owned directly by the ministry.  This was part of a program initiated by the conservative-liberal government to privatize the maintenance of the tracks, by forcing the administration to perform tenders; similar policies were being enforced on the Public Roads Administration and Coastal Administration. The process of privatizing the work of 1,100 employees was discontinued after the 2005 election, following the victory of the socialist coalition government.

Operations

The network consists of 716 tunnels, 2,572 bridges and 3,690 level crossings. The railways transported 61,121,000 passengers for 3,202 million passenger kilometers and 30,271,000 tonnes of cargo for 3,489 million tonne kilometers in 2012. The same year there were 20 train-related accidents, with two fatalities.

Organization
The administration was divided into a directorate and divisions for infrastructure management, infrastructure construction and traffic management; BaneEnergi is subordinate to the traffic management and was responsible for supplying electricity to the railway companies. Main offices was located in Oslo, while regional offices was located in Bergen, Hamar and Trondheim, while train control areas was also located in Drammen, Kristiansand, Stavanger and Narvik. The administration also ran the Norwegian Railway College in Oslo and the Norwegian Railway Museum in Hamar. The agency had about 2,900 employees.

In 2007, the administration had a revenue of NOK 5,661 million, of which 1,934 M went to operation, 1,369 M to maintenance, 67 M to the Gardermoen Line and 2,291 M to investments. Of the investments 82% went to new lines, notably the Asker Line (25%), Stavanger–Sandnes (17%), Lysaker Station (17%) and Ganddal Yard (8%). The administration received most of its income from the ministry, but railway companies had to pay to use the Gardermoen Line.

Stations
At the time of the demerger, all stations were transferred to NSB, but the administration retained ownership of the platforms. All stations opened after 1996 were owned by the administration; this has caused a complex ownership structure where sections of the stations may have different owners. The operation of all stations was remained at the administration, while the NSB subsidiary Rom Eiendom is responsible for managing the railway unrelated sections of the stations, for instance the shopping center in Oslo Central Station.

Railway companies
The companies that have agreements to access the national railway are Borregård Rail, Cargolink,  CargoNet, Flytoget, Green Cargo, Hector Rail, Malmtrafik, Norwegian State Railways, NSB Gjøvikbanen, Ofotbanen, Peterson Rail, SJ, Tågåkeriet and the Valdres Line.

Rolling stock
The National Rail Administration maintained a small fleet of maintenance trains and track inspection railcars themselves. All of Jernbaneverkets trains are yellow and diesel operated. When Baneservice was demerged, they took over most of the maintenance units. Jernbaneverket's stock:
 1 Di 3a (snowplow)
 3 Di R3 (snowplow and shunter)
 2 MZ
 2 Skd 225 (shunter)
 17 LM2 (catenary inspection)
 4 LM4 (catenary rebuilding)
 5 LM5 (catenary maintenance)
 5 LM6 (catenary maintenance)
 1 Roger 300 (track inspection)
 1 Roger 1000 (track inspection)
 1 YF1 (rescue)

References

Bibliography

External links 
  (Redirects to www.banenor.no)
 Stock list for Jernbaneverket

 
Defunct government agencies of Norway
Railway companies of Norway
Government railway authorities of Norway
Railway infrastructure managers
Government agencies established in 1996
Railway companies established in 1996
Railway companies disestablished in 2016
1996 establishments in Norway
Ministry of Transport (Norway)
Defunct transport organisations based in Norway
2016 disestablishments in Norway